The Royal Exchange is a 2017 Belgian-French historical film based on the eponymous novel by Chantal Thomas.

Cast 
 Lambert Wilson - Philippe V
 Anamaria Vartolomei - Louise-Élisabeth
 Olivier Gourmet - Philippe d'Orléans
 Catherine Mouchet - Madame de Ventadour
 Kacey Mottet Klein - Don Luis

References

External links 

2010s historical films
2017 films
2010s French-language films
French historical films
2010s French films